The 2021 season is FC Seoul's 38th season in the K League 1.

Pre-season
 First Winter Training Camp: In Changwon, South Korea - From 7 January 2021 to 27 January 2021
 Second Winter Training Camp: In Jeju, South Korea - From 1 February 2021 to 21 February 2021

Pre-season match results

Competitions

Overview

K League 1

League table

Results summary

Results by round

Matches

FA Cup

Match reports and match highlights
Fixtures and Results at FC Seoul Official Website

Season statistics

K League 1 records

All competitions records

Attendance records

 Season total attendance is K League 1, FA Cup, and AFC Champions League combined

Squad statistics

Goals

Coaching staff

Park Jin-sub era (–6 September 2021)

An Ik-soo era (6 September 2021–)

Players

Team squad
 All players registered for the 2021 season are listed.

Out on loan and military service

Note: Where a player has not declared an international allegiance, nation is determined by place of birth.
※ In: Transferred from other teams in the middle of the season.
※ Out: Transferred to other teams in the middle of the season.
※ Discharged: Transferred from Gimcheon Sangmuu for military service in the middle of the season (registered in 2021 season).
※ Conscripted: Transferred to Gimcheon Sangmu for military service after the end of the season.

Transfers

Tactics

Tactical analysis

Starting eleven and formation

Substitutes

See also
 FC Seoul

References

External links
 FC Seoul official website 

FC Seoul seasons
South Korean football clubs 2021 season